Billbergia oxysepala is a species of flowering plant in the genus Billbergia. This species is native to Ecuador and to the Brazilian State of Acre.

Cultivars
 Billbergia oxysepala × eloiseae

References

oxysepala
Flora of Ecuador
Flora of Brazil
Plants described in 1904